Aiden Kyle Markram (born 4 October 1994) is a South African cricketer who is the current captain of the South Africa national cricket team in T20'S international cricket. and captained the South African under-19 cricket team to win the 2014 ICC Under-19 Cricket World Cup. In the 2018 South African Cricket Annual, he was named as one of the five Cricketers of the Year. Markram has been described by former captain and batsman Graeme Smith as a future South Africa captain. He made his international debut for South Africa in September 2017.

Domestic and T20 franchise career
Markram made his first class debut for Northerns cricket team against South Western Districts on 9 October 2014. He was included in the Northerns cricket team squad for the 2015 Africa T20 Cup. In 2016, Markram was club professional for Walkden in the Bolton Cricket League.

In May 2017, Markram was named Domestic Newcomer of the Year at Cricket South Africa's annual awards. In August 2017, he was named in Nelson Mandela Bay Stars' squad for the first season of the T20 Global League. However, in October 2017, Cricket South Africa initially postponed the tournament until November 2018, with it being cancelled soon after.

In October 2018, Markram was named in Paarl Rocks' squad for the first edition of the Mzansi Super League T20 tournament.

In March 2019, Markram signed for Hampshire County Cricket Club as their overseas player for the first part of the season. Later the same month, Markram scored 127 runs in the final of the 2018–19 Momentum One Day Cup, to help Titans win the tournament.

In September 2019, Markram was named in the squad for the Paarl Rocks team for the 2019 Mzansi Super League tournament. In April 2021, he was named in Northerns' squad, ahead of the 2021–22 cricket season in South Africa.

On 11 September 2021, Markram was included in the Punjab Kings squad for the second phase of the 2021 Indian Premier League (IPL) in the UAE. In February 2022, he was bought by the Sunrisers Hyderabad in the auction for the 2022 Indian Premier League tournament.

International career

Debut years
In June 2017, Markram was named in South Africa's Test squad for their series against England, but did not play. In August 2017, he was named as captain of the South Africa A cricket team for their two four-day matches against India A.

In September 2017, Markram was named in South Africa's Test squad for their series against Bangladesh. He made his Test debut for South Africa against Bangladesh on 28 September 2017.

Record breaking start
After narrowly missing out on a maiden Test century on debut, Markram completed the feat in the second Test against Bangladesh on 6 October 2017 scoring 143 off 186 balls before being bowled by Rubel Hossain.

In October 2017, Markram was added to South Africa's One Day International (ODI) squad ahead of the third match against Bangladesh, replacing Hashim Amla. He made his ODI debut for South Africa against Bangladesh on 22 October 2017, scored 66 runs and took 2 wickets.

In December 2017, Markram scored his second Test hundred and became the first South Africa player to score two centuries in his first three Tests.

One Day International captaincy
In February 2018, South Africa's captain Faf du Plessis was ruled out of the last five ODIs and the Twenty20 International (T20I) series against India due to a finger injury. Markram was named as South Africa's captain for the remaining ODI fixtures in du Plessis' absence. He, at the age of 23 years 123 days, is the second youngest player to captain South Africa in ODIs after Graeme Smith.

2018–present
On 30 March 2018, Markram scored his career-best score of 152 runs on the first day of the fourth test against Australia.

In June 2018, Markram was named in South Africa's Test squad for a two Test series in Sri Lanka. Markram averaged just 10 with the bat in this series, his first overseas for South Africa, which showed a vulnerability against spin bowling.

In August 2018, Markram was named in South Africa's Twenty20 International (T20I) squad for the one-off match against Sri Lanka, but he did not play in the fixture. In March 2019, he was again named in South Africa's T20I squad, this time for the series against Sri Lanka. He made his T20I debut for South Africa against Sri Lanka on 22 March 2019.

In April 2019, Markram was named in South Africa's squad for the 2019 Cricket World Cup.

In August 2019, Markram was named in South Africa's squad for the three Test series in India. Markram struggled in the first two matches of this series, bagging a pair in the second Test, before being ruled out of the third due to a self-inflicted wrist injury. This series raised further questions about Markram's overseas performances, averaging just 10.50 in four away Tests, all in the subcontinent.

In December 2019, Markram was named in South Africa's squad for the four Test home series against England. In the first Test, he scored 20 runs in the first innings and 2 in the second as South Africa beat England by 107 runs at Centurion. Markram however missed the remainder of the series after fracturing his finger.

In January 2021, Markram was named in South Africa's Test squad for their series against Pakistan. In the first test, Markram scored a patient 74 in a losing effort. In the second test, Markram made his first century in more than two and a half years, and his first in Asia. Markram finished as the leading run scorer in the series, averaging 56.75, however South Africa lost the series, their first Test series defeat against Pakistan since 2003.

Achievements
 Named in ICC Men's T20I Team of the Year for the year 2021.

References

External links
 

1994 births
Living people
South African cricketers
South Africa Test cricketers
South Africa One Day International cricketers
South Africa Twenty20 International cricketers
Northerns cricketers
People from Centurion, Gauteng
Titans cricketers
Durham cricketers
Cricketers at the 2019 Cricket World Cup
Hampshire cricketers
Paarl Rocks cricketers
Sportspeople from Gauteng
Sunrisers Hyderabad cricketers